Elvira Madigan is a 1967 Swedish film directed by Bo Widerberg, based on the tragedy of the Danish slackrope dancer Hedvig Jensen (born 1867), working under the stage name of Elvira Madigan at her stepfather's travelling circus, who runs away with the Swedish nobleman lieutenant Sixten Sparre (born 1854).

Plot
Elvira Madigan and Sixten Sparre are together in the Danish countryside, having run away together and abandoned their past lives.  Sparre has renounced the military and now claims to be "on the women's side."  Elvira, who was the main attraction at her circus, has got her identity back and starts to refer to herself with her real name Hedvig.

A friend from Sparre's regiment tries to persuade him to come back, but fails. They have no money or future and try to fish and earn money the best they can. Hedvig sells a picture of herself drawn by Toulouse-Lautrec and is paid to entertain a party with her dancing. Eventually, Sparre shot her to death and then killed himself.

Cast
 Pia Degermark - Hedvig Jensen, "Elvira Madigan"
 Thommy Berggren - Lt. Sixten Sparre
 Lennart Malmer - Kristoffer
 Cleo Jensen - Cleo
 Yvonne Ingdal - Elvira Madigan's voice

Soundtrack
The soundtrack features Géza Anda playing the Andante from Piano Concerto No. 21 in C by Mozart, which is now sometimes referred to as the "Elvira Madigan" Concerto, as well as Vivaldi's Four Seasons.

Anda's Deutsche Grammophon LP of Concerto No. 21 was re-issued with a cover showing Pia Degermark in costume in a still from the film.

Awards and nominations
 BAFTA Awards
 Best Cinematography (Persson, nominated)
 Most Promising Newcomer to Leading Film Roles (Degermark, nominated)
 Cannes Film Festival
 Best Actress (Degermark, won)
 Golden Palm (Widerberg, nominated)
 Golden Globe Awards
 Best Foreign-Language Foreign Film (nominated)
 Most Promising Newcomer - Female (Degermark, nominated)
 National Board of Review
 Best Foreign Language Film (won)

Critical responses
According to the Time Out Film Guide: "Candidate for the prettiest pic ever award. ... you may be enchanted by it if you don't laugh yourself sick." Describing it as breathing the "hippie mid-sixties", Edgardo Cozarinsky writes: "Though the lovers are there as early instances of drop-outs, and several contemporary readings effortlessly emerge, Widerberg's real concern is with the sensuous presence of cream and berry juice on lips and fingertips". For Widerberg, "this affirmation in the face of death carries ... the weight of a modest but combative ideological point".

See also 
 Elvira Madigan (1943 film)
  Elvira Madigan (Danish film released 21 October 1967)

References

External links

Chicago Sun-Times review 

1967 drama films
1967 films
Films directed by Bo Widerberg
1960s Swedish-language films
Films about suicide
Swedish drama films
1960s Swedish films